Mário Pečalka (born 28 December 1980) is a former Slovak football defender.

Career
Pečalka began playing football in his hometown club OFK Rudina. Later he moved to Kysucké Nové Mesto and then he played for the Czech Fourth Division team FK Mutěnice. In 2003, he came back to his home region to play for the Slovak Fourth League team TJ Slovan Rudinská. In 2004, he was on loan in Slovan Bratislava which was playing in the Slovak Second League in this time. After end of loan he signed for the Corgoň Liga club MŠK Žilina. He played for Žilina in 103 matches overall, scoring 4 goals. He twice won the Slovak title in Žilina. He became one of the best Corgoň Liga defenders and was selected to the national team in 2009. He played 5 group matches in the 2010–11 UEFA Champions League. In February 2011, he signed for Israeli club Hapoel Tel Aviv. He made his debut for Hapoel in a 2–0 win against Maccabi Petah Tikva on 14 February 2011. In January 2012, he signed on loan at Slovan Bratislava for half a year. In May 2013, he announced the end of his professional career due persistent back problems.

International career
Pečalka made his national team debut in a 2–3 defeat against Ukraine on 10 February 2009. He was called up to the Slovakia preliminary squad for the 2010 FIFA World Cup but manager Vladimír Weiss did not select him for the final tournament squad.

Honours
Žilina
Corgoň Liga (2): 2006–07, 2009–10
Slovak Super Cup (2): 2007, 2010

Hapoel Tel Aviv
Israel State Cup (1): 2010–11

References

External links
Hapoel Tel Aviv profile

1980 births
Living people
Association football central defenders
Slovak footballers
Slovakia international footballers
ŠK Slovan Bratislava players
FK Inter Bratislava players
MŠK Žilina players
Hapoel Tel Aviv F.C. players
Slovak Super Liga players
Israeli Premier League players
Slovak expatriate footballers
Expatriate footballers in Israel
Slovak expatriate sportspeople in Israel